Samuel Mowbray Hammond (October 24, 1870 – November 20, 1934) was an American football coach and physician.  He served as the head coach at Purdue University for one season in 1896 and at Lehigh University for one season in 1897, compiling a career record of 7–9–1.

Coaching career

Purdue
Hammond's first coaching position was for the Purdue Boilermakers in West Lafayette, Indiana.  Highlights of his one season as coach include a victory of the Notre Dame Fighting Irish and the DePauw Tigers.

Lehigh
Hammond was named the sixth head football coach at Lehigh University in Bethlehem, Pennsylvania and he held that position for the 1897 season.  His coaching record at Lehigh was 3–7.

Medical career and death
Hammond graduated from the Yale School of Medicine in 1893.  While coaching football at Purdue, he was also a member of the physics faculty.  Hammond practiced medicine as an ear and eye specialist in Hartford and New Haven, Connecticut for nearly four decades.  He died at his winter home in St. Petersburg, Florida on November 20, 1934.

Head coaching record

References

External links
 

1870 births
1934 deaths
Physicians from New Haven, Connecticut
Lehigh Mountain Hawks football coaches
Purdue Boilermakers football coaches
Purdue University faculty
Yale School of Medicine alumni
People from New Canaan, Connecticut